The 1875 Bedfordshire by-election was fought on 28 April 1875.  The byelection was fought due to the resignation of the incumbent Liberal MP, Francis Bassett.  It was won by the Liberal candidate Marquess of Tavistock, who was unopposed.

References

1875 in England
1875 elections in the United Kingdom
By-elections to the Parliament of the United Kingdom in Bedfordshire constituencies
19th century in Bedfordshire
Unopposed by-elections to the Parliament of the United Kingdom in English constituencies
April 1875 events